João Pedro Cavaco Cancelo (born 27 May 1994) is a Portuguese professional footballer who plays as a full-back or as a wing-back for Bundesliga club Bayern Munich, on loan from Manchester City. He represents the Portugal national team. 
A creative, skillful, strong, and versatile player, Cancelo is considered to be one of the best full-backs in the world.

After coming through Benfica's youth academy, Cancelo began playing for the club's reserve side in 2012 and was promoted to the first team two years later. He was subsequently loaned to La Liga club Valencia during the 2014–15 season, with Los Ches making the move permanent in the summer of 2015. Cancelo was on loan to Serie A team Inter Milan during the 2017–18 season, in which he was included in Serie A's Team of the Year. Cancelo's performances sparked the interest of Italian rivals Juventus, who signed him in 2018 for a reported fee of €40.4 million. During his stint with Bianconeri, Cancelo won the league and the Supercoppa Italiana in his first and only season.

In 2019, he was signed by English club Manchester City, for a reported fee of €60 million (£55 million) involving a swap deal including Danilo to Juventus. He has since won two Premier League titles and two League Cup titles with the club. In 2020–21, he played a significant role in Manchester City reaching their first ever UEFA Champions League final.

Cancelo made his senior debut for Portugal in 2016 after previously being capped by the nations's all youth team levels, winning 75 caps and scoring three goals overall. He was also part of Portugal's under-21 team that reached the 2015 UEFA European Championship Final. He was chosen in Portugal's squad for the 2019 UEFA Nations League Finals on home soil, winning the inaugural edition of the competition with his nation.

Club career

Benfica
Born in Barreiro, Setúbal District, Cancelo started playing football with local club Barreirense. He joined Benfica's youth system in 2007 at the age of 13, where he played as both right and left back.

On 28 July 2012, Cancelo made his debut with Benfica's first team in a friendly against Gil Vicente where he played the full 90 minutes as a right back. Despite being registered with the B-side, he was touted as a possible replacement to Maxi Pereira in the seniors; until 2013 he also represented the juniors, and on 18 May of that year he scored the two decisive goals in a 2–1 win over Rio Ave to win the national championship.

Cancelo played his first competitive game with Benfica's main squad on 25 January 2014, coming on as a late substitute in the 1–0 home success against Gil Vicente for the Taça da Liga, which was later won. His maiden appearance in the Primeira Liga occurred on 10 May after they had already been crowned league champions, and he started in a 2–1 loss in the Clássico against Porto.

Valencia

2014–16: Debut season and regular starter

On 20 August 2014, Cancelo joined Valencia on a one-year loan deal with the option to purchase for €15 million. Although his economic rights were owned by Peter Lim, a loan was arranged to take him to Valencia due to Lim's purchase of the latter club. His La Liga debut occurred on 25 September, playing the entirety of a 3–0 home win over Córdoba; He initially started as a substitute and appeared in the round of 16 round of the Copa del Rey in the first leg against Rayo Vallecano. He would also occasionally move to the right wing and later his good performances, specially against Levante on 12 April 2015, in which he was awarded the man of the match. Throughout the season, he was used a second choice right-back behind Antonio Barragán, finishing the season with 13 appearances, across all competitions. Cancelo's performances helped Valencia reach Champions League, leading on 25 May, Cancelo agreeing to a permanent contract with the Spanish club until 30 June 2021, for a transfer fee of €15 million.

In the following season, Cancelo became a starter earning his debut in the UEFA Champions League on 16 September, where he scored his first goal for Los Che in a 2–3 home loss to Zenit Saint Petersburg. In doing so, he became the fifth youngest scorer in the history of Valencia in the Champions League (aged 21 years and 107 days). On 2 December, Cancelo scored his first goal Copa del Rey in a 3–1 victory over Barakaldo. Valencia was eliminated from the tournament after losing 8–1 on aggregate to Barcelona. He also netted for the first time in the league the following 20 April to conclude a 4–0 win over Eibar at the Mestalla Stadium.

2016–17: Final season with Valencia
In the 2016–17 season, Cancelo performances slightly got worse with Cancelo making some errors leading him to commit a penalty in Valencia's first league match in a 2–4 loss against Las Palmas. Despite his errors, Cancelo's performances got better, leading him to be used more often with new coach Cesare Prandelli, with his position being changed to the right-wing. Cancelo was fixed in the eleven throughout the season, playing almost the same number of games between the right-back and the right-wing. On 2 April he scored his first league goal in a 3–0 victory against Deportivo La Coruña. Afterwards, Cancelo made a "shush" gesture towards Valencia's fans, who criticized him for his defensive errors, but he immediately apologized for the gesture.

Loan to Inter Milan
On 22 August 2017, Cancelo joined Inter Milan on a one-year loan deal until 30 June 2018 with the option of making the move permanent. The deal was part of a loan exchange, with Geoffrey Kondogbia moving in the other direction. He made his Serie A debut four days later, replacing Antonio Candreva in the 83rd minute of a 3–1 win at Roma.

Cancelo suffered a knee ligament injury in late August 2017 while on international duty, going on to be sidelined for one-and-a-half months. He returned to action during the 3–2 home victory over A.C. Milan in the Derby della Madonnina, featuring 20 minutes. After a few weeks of adaptation in the Serie A, Cancelo made his debut as a starter at the Coppa Italia in a home victory against Pordenone. On 17 April 2018, he scored his first league goal with a free kick in a 4–0 home victory over Cagliari. 
During his phase of adaptation in Serie A, in which was added some tactical misunderstanding, his performances began progressively improving, leading him to be included in Serie A's Team of the Year. Despite his good performances during the season, the club opted to not buy Cancelo.

Juventus

On 27 June 2018, Cancelo was signed by Juventus on a five-year contract for €40.4 million, making his domestic league debut on 18 August in a 3–2 away win against Chievo Verona. He won his first trophy with the club in January 2019, featuring the entire 1–0 victory over Milan for the Supercoppa Italiana. He scored his first league goal the same month, as his team came from behind to defeat Lazio 2–1 at the Stadio Olimpico in Rome; he also helped win the decisive match-winning penalty later during the same game, which was subsequently converted by compatriot Cristiano Ronaldo. On 6 October, Cancelo provided an assist for Rodrigo Bentancur in a 2–0 away win over Udinese. On 7 December, Cancelo provided an assist for Mario Mandžukić in a 1–0 home win over against his former club Inter Milan in the Derby d'Italia.

On 10 April 2019 Cancelo provided an assist for his compatriot Cristiano Ronaldo in a 1–1 away draw in the first leg of Juventus' Champions League quarter-final against Ajax, on 10 April. In the second leg in Turin on 16 April, Juventus eventually lost the match 2–1, and were eliminated from the competition. Four days later, Cancelo played in the Scudetto-clinching match against rivals Fiorentina, as Juventus won their eighth successive league title after a 2–1 home triumph.

Manchester City

2019–20: Record transfer and struggles

On 7 August 2019, Cancelo joined Premier League champions Manchester City in a six-year deal worth £27.4 million plus Danilo being sent to Juventus in part-exchange, equalling to £60 million, making him the most expensive right-back ever. On 25 August, he made his Premier League debut against Bournemouth appearing as a late substitute for Kyle Walker in a 3–1 victory. On 18 December, he scored his first goal for City in a 3–1 away win over Oxford United in the quarter-finals of the EFL Cup.

Initially, Cancelo struggled during his first season in the club, looking out of position the matches he played and failed to seal a starting spot in the team, competing against Walker for a right-back spot.

2020–21: Breakthrough and European Final
On 17 October 2020, Cancelo made his first league start for the new season after an injury in a 1–0 home win over Arsenal. On 3 November, he scored his first Champions League goal for City in a 3–0 home win over Olympiacos in the group stage, and on 26 January 2021, he scored his first Premier League goal in a 5–0 away win over West Bromwich Albion. On 24 February, he was named man of the match, after providing an assist to Bernardo Silva in Manchester City's 2–0 away win over Borussia Mönchengladbach in the first leg of the round of 16 tie.

During the season, Cancelo's ability to come inside from full-back to maintain control of the ball in central midfield position, while ensuring his team was in a more stable defensive shape when possession was lost, was praised as being one of the key factors in Manchester City regaining the Premier League title that season, while also being named in the PFA Premier League Team of the Year.

2021–22: Second Premier League title
On 17 October 2021, Cancelo scored his first goal of the season for City in a 6–3 home Champions League group stage win against RB Leipzig. On 3 November, Cancelo provided a hat-trick of assists for Phil Foden, Riyad Mahrez and Gabriel Jesus in a 4–1 Champions League group stage home victory against Club Brugge, leading him to be named man of the match. On 6 November, in the Manchester derby, Cancelo created both goals in a 2–0 victory against Manchester United at Old Trafford, forcing an Eric Bailly own goal and providing an assist for Bernardo Silva, for his fifth assist of the season in two games. On 19 December, on his 100th appearance for the club, he scored a long-range shot and provided an assist in a 4–0 win against Newcastle United.

Loan to Bayern Munich
On 31 January 2023, Cancelo was loaned to Bayern Munich for the remainder of the season. Cancelo made his debut in a 4–0 DFB-Pokal win over Mainz 05, registering an assist for Eric Maxim Choupo-Moting's goal. On 11 March, he scored his first goal in a 5–3 win over Augsburg.

International career

Youth

Cancelo represented Portugal in the 2012 UEFA European Under-19 Championship. He was also selected for the following edition in Lithuania.

With the under-20s, Cancelo appeared at the 2013 FIFA World Cup and the 2014 Toulon Tournament. He featured in two games in the former competition, with the country reaching the round-of-16.

Cancelo was part of the under-21 squad that competed in the 2015 European Championships. He replaced left-back Raphaël Guerreiro midway through the second half of the 5–0 semi-final win against Germany for his only appearance of the tournament, in a final runner-up finish to Sweden.

Senior
Cancelo was called up for the first time to the senior team by head coach Fernando Santos on 26 August 2016, playing the full 90 minutes of a 5–0 friendly win over Gibraltar in Porto on 1 September and scoring the third goal. In the following month he added another two, in as many 2018 FIFA World Cup qualifiers against Andorra (6–0, home) and Faroe Islands (away, same score).

In May 2018, Cancelo was included in a preliminary 35-man squad for the finals in Russia, but he did not make the final cut. Cancelo was selected for all four matches in the league phase of the 2018–19 UEFA Nations League group stage, helping the hosts Portugal qualify to the inaugural Nations League Finals in June 2019. In the UEFA Nations League Finals, Portugal defeated the Netherlands 1–0 in Porto to win the trophy.

Cancelo was initially included in Portugal's squad for UEFA Euro 2020 in June 2021; however, he tested positive for COVID-19 two days prior to the side's opening match against Hungary, and was replaced in the squad by Diogo Dalot.

In October 2022, he was named in Portugal's preliminary 55-man squad for the 2022 FIFA World Cup in Qatar, being included in the final 26-man squad for the tournament.

Style of play

Regarded as a promising player in the media, Cancelo is mainly known for his speed, energy and offensive capabilities, as well as his technique, dribbling skills, creativity and crossing ability. He is capable of playing as a full-back or winger on either flank, although he usually plays on the right. During his time at Juventus, he was considered one of the best full-backs in Europe. Despite his ability going forward, however, his tactical sense, positioning, and defensive skills have been cited as weaknesses in the media.

When playing as a traditional full-back he times his forward runs well. He tends to move forward when in possession rather than making lung-busting overlapping runs around the outside of a teammate, and he prefers to receive to feet rather than chase through balls. On the ball, he is equally capable of cutting infield from the right as he is going around the outside, and will regularly look to cross with his weaker left foot or drive inside the opposing left-back and look to combine with those further forward. He is a very strong dribbler and that ability, combined with the fact he is confident on either foot, makes him extremely difficult to defend against. His speed also allow him to be fast enough that to recover at defensive transitions, and is always aware of the space he leaves behind him when his team attacks.

In his second season in Manchester City, under manager Pep Guardiola, Cancelo was developed into one of his hybrid players, who plays both at full-back and in central midfield in the same game. During City's 4–3–3 formation, when out of possession, Cancelo moved into central midfield alongside Rodri, leaving five players to form their attacking line. With their back three spread wide across the pitch, Cancelo, Rodri and two attacking midfielders often form a box in midfield to overload central areas. If City play centrally, Cancelo is often their target – he has proved brilliant at receiving in central midfield and progressing play with daring and accurate forward passes. Cancelo also become one of City's most effective creative players, often adopting positions in either half-space before delivering a ball into the penalty area or slipping a through ball between defenders. When in a more withdrawn position, Cancelo is adept at moving into central midfield and playing a ball over the top for a runner in behind. With Cancelo instead adding an extra player in midfield, their attack is better set up to deal with defensive transitions.

Personal life
In January 2013, Cancelo's mother Filomena was killed in a car accident on the A2 motorway in Seixal. Cancelo and his brother were asleep and received only minor injuries. Due to the emotional toll it took on him, Cancelo considered retiring from football.

Cancelo and his girlfriend Daniela Machado had a daughter in 2019. On 30 December 2021, their Manchester home was burgled by four men who stole some of his personal jewellery. Cancelo retaliated in self-defence and suffered facial injuries, but said that his family were safe.

Career statistics

Club

International

Portugal score listed first, score column indicates score after each Cancelo goal.

Honours
Benfica
Primeira Liga: 2013–14

Juventus
Serie A: 2018–19
Supercoppa Italiana: 2018

Manchester City
Premier League: 2020–21, 2021–22
EFL Cup: 2020–21
UEFA Champions League runner-up: 2020–21

Portugal U21
UEFA European Under-21 Championship runner-up: 2015

Portugal
UEFA Nations League: 2018–19

Individual
Serie A Team of the Year: 2017–18, 2018–19
PFA Premier League Team of the Year: 2020–21, 2021–22
 ESM Team of the Year: 2020–21, 2021–22
UEFA Champions League Fantasy Football Team of the Season: 2021–22
 FIFA FIFPRO World 11: 2022

Notes

References

External links

Valencia official profile

1994 births
Living people
Sportspeople from Barreiro, Portugal
Portuguese footballers
Portugal youth international footballers
Portugal under-21 international footballers
Portugal international footballers
Association football defenders
F.C. Barreirense players
S.L. Benfica B players
S.L. Benfica footballers
Valencia CF players
Inter Milan players
Juventus F.C. players
Manchester City F.C. players
FC Bayern Munich footballers
Liga Portugal 2 players
Primeira Liga players
La Liga players
Serie A players
Premier League players
Bundesliga players
Portuguese expatriate footballers
UEFA Nations League-winning players
Expatriate footballers in England
Expatriate footballers in Italy
Expatriate footballers in Spain
Expatriate footballers in Germany
Portuguese expatriate sportspeople in England
Portuguese expatriate sportspeople in Italy
Portuguese expatriate sportspeople in Spain
Portuguese expatriate sportspeople in Germany
2022 FIFA World Cup players